Daria Tatarinova (born 3 June 2004) is a Russian competitive swimmer. At the 2021 European Junior Swimming Championships, she won the gold medal in the 50 metre freestyle in European junior record time as well as gold medals in the 4×100 metre freestyle relay, 4×100 metre mixed freestyle relay, 4×100 metre mixed medley relay, and the silver medal in the 100 metre freestyle.

Early life
Tatarinova was born 3 June 2004 in Saint Petersburg, Russia. She competes for Saint Petersburg swim club in national competitions.

International career

2021 European Junior Championships

At the 2021 European Junior Swimming Championships held at the Stadio Olimpico del Nuoto in Rome, Italy when she was 17 years old, Tatarinova won her first medal in the 100 metre freestyle, swimming a personal best time of 55.12 seconds, which earned her the silver medal in the event. In the same evening she won the silver medal, the evening of 7 July, Tatarinova split a 54.56 on the third leg of the 4×100 metre mixed freestyle relay in the final to help earn the gold medal in the event and contribute to Russia taking over first place in the total medal table across the first two days of competition. The third day of competition, 8 July, Tatarinova won a gold medal as part of the 4×100 metre mixed medley relay, swimming the freestyle leg of the relay with a time of 54.66 seconds in the final to help the relay finish in 3:50.25. Day five, she led-off the 4×100 metre freestyle relay with a time of 55.29 seconds to contribute to the time of 3:40.10 in the final, which set a new Championships record in the event and earned the relay members the gold medal.

On the sixth and final day of competition, Tatarinova set a new European junior record and Championships record in the 50 metre freestyle with a personal best and gold medal-winning time of 24.87 seconds, which was 0.48 seconds faster than silver medalist Jana Pavalić of Croatia. Speaking to LEN about her win, Tatarinova said, "It was very hard but rewarding as well. Russia has an important role in swimming, our athletes often succeed in making international podiums. We work hard, both swimmers and coaches." Her performance led the Italian Swimming Federation to dub Tatarinova the "queen of fast" for the event.

2022: Double ban for being Russian
Because Tatarinova was born in Russia and continued to compete for her country, she was banned by FINA, the world governing body for aquatic sports, from all of their competition between 21 April 2022 and the end of the calendar year along with all other Russians and Belarusians. FINA also did not count times swum by Russians at other competitions in the remainder of the year for world rankings nor world records. Additionally, she was banned for being herself along with all other Russians and Belarusians by LEN, the European governing body for aquatic sports, from all of their events indefinitely, with zero intent to ever allow them to compete again communicated at the time of ban implementation in March 2022.

International championships

Personal best times

Long course metres (50 m pool)

Legend: EJ – European Junior record

European junior records

Long course metres (50 m pool)

References

2004 births
Living people
Russian female freestyle swimmers
Russian female butterfly swimmers